The 1929 Philadelphia Athletics season involved the A's finishing first in the American League with a record of 104 wins and 46 losses. After finishing in second place to the New York Yankees in 1927 and 1928, the club won the 1929 pennant by a large 18-game margin. The club won the World Series over the National League champion Chicago Cubs, four games to one.

Offseason
 January 5, 1929: Homer Summa was purchased by the Athletics from the Cleveland Indians.

Regular season
Led by longtime owner-manager Connie Mack, the Athletics dominated during the regular season. Mack had purchased quite a few players from the Baltimore Orioles minor league club, and many of them would contribute to the A's 1929–31 dynasty.

The most famous of these players was ace Lefty Grove. In 1929, Grove led the American League in ERA and strikeouts on his way to a 20–6 record. Big George Earnshaw was the number two pitcher on the squad. He led the league in wins (24) and was second in strikeouts. Led by these two, Philadelphia allowed the fewest runs of any AL team.

On the offensive side, the A's boasted future Hall of Famers Mickey Cochrane, Jimmie Foxx, and Al Simmons. Simmons beat out Babe Ruth for the RBI crown in 1929.

Season standings

Record vs. opponents

Roster

Player stats

Batting

Starters by position
Note: Pos = Position; G = Games played; AB = At bats; H = Hits; Avg. = Batting average; HR = Home runs; RBI = Runs batted in

Other batters
Note: Pos = Position; G = Games played; AB = At bats; H = Hits; Avg. = Batting average; HR = Home runs; RBI = Runs batted in

Pitching

Starting pitchers
Note: G = Games pitched; GS = Games started; IP = Innings pitched; W = Wins; L = Losses; ERA = Earned run average; SO = Strikeouts

Other pitchers
Note: G = Games pitched; IP = Innings pitched; W = Wins; L = Losses; ERA = Earned run average; SO = Strikeouts

Relief pitchers
Note: G = Games pitched; W = Wins; L = Losses; SV = Saves; ERA = Earned run average; SO = Strikeouts

1929 World Series 

AL Philadelphia Athletics (4) vs. NL Chicago Cubs (1)

Farm system

Awards and honors

League leaders 
Lefty Grove, American League leader, strikeouts

More recent honors 
Al Simmons and the 1929–1931 Athletics were the subject of an August 19, 1996, cover story in Sports Illustrated with the teaser, "The Team that Time Forgot". Author William Nack wrote, "according to most old-timers who played in that era, the 1927 and '28 Yankees and the 1929 and '30 Athletics matched up so closely that they were nearly equal, with the A's given the nod in fielding and pitching and the Yankees in hitting."

On August 16, 2009, the Oakland Athletics celebrated the 80th anniversary of the 1929 team by wearing 1929 home uniforms against the Chicago White Sox. First pitches were thrown out by Kathleen Kelly, the granddaughter of Connie Mack, and Jim Conlin, the grandson of Jimmie Foxx. The A's won the game on a walk-off home run by Mark Ellis.

References

External links
1929 Philadelphia Athletics team page at Baseball Reference
1929 Philadelphia Athletics team page at www.baseball-almanac.com
MLB.com: Photo Gallery of Oakland Athletics wearing 1929 uniforms on August 16, 2009
Lost In History: 1929 Philadelphia Athletics, Sports Illustrated August 19, 1996

Oakland Athletics seasons
Philadelphia Athletics season
American League champion seasons
World Series champion seasons
Oakland